Sonja Beate Fuss (born 5 November 1978) is a German football defender. She played for the Chicago Red Stars in the National Women's Soccer League (NWSL) and the Germany national team. She has played in the German Frauen-Bundesliga since 1992. In 2011, together with Inka Grings, she played for Swiss side, FC Zürich Frauen.

Early life

Hartford University
Fuss attended the University of Hartford located in West Hartford, Connecticut.

Playing career

Club
Fuss spent most of her career playing for SV Grün-Weiß, which was renamed FFC Brauweiler Pulheim in 2000. In 2004, she transferred to FSV Frankfurt.

In February 2005, she signed with FFC Turbine Potsdam. She returned to FFC Brauweiler Pulheim after one season.

At the beginning of the season 2006/07, she moved to FCR 2001 Duisburg.

In July 2009, Fuss moved to the first FC Köln, the newly formed women's soccer Division 1, for the 2009/10 season. In January 2011, she returned to play for FCR 2001 Duisburg. Her contract there was disbanded in August 2011 and she then signed on 28 August at FC Zürich Frauen.

On 16 March 2013, along with  Inka Grings, Fuss left Zürich for National Women's Soccer League (NWSL) club, the Chicago Red Stars, in May 2013.

She was waived by the Red Stars in September 2013.

International
Fuss played in her first international match in 1996 against the Netherlands. She scored her first international goal on 15 November 2003 against Portugal. Fuss was a European champion in 1997, 2005 and 2009 and world champion in 2003 and 2007. In 2004, she was a member of the bronze medal-winning German squad at the Olympic Games in Athens.

Honors and awards
National
 World Champion in 2003 and 2007
 European champion in 1997, 2005 and 2009
 Olympic bronze medal in 2004

Club football
 German Champion 1997
 Swiss Champion 2011/12, 2012/13
 Swiss Cupsiegerin 2012, 2013
 DFB Cup winner in 1997, 2005 and 2009
 UEFA Women's Cup winner in 2005 and 2009

References

External links

 DFB profile
 Chicago Red Stars player profile
 FC Zürich Frauen player profile

1978 births
Living people
German women's footballers
German expatriate women's footballers
Germany women's international footballers
2003 FIFA Women's World Cup players
2007 FIFA Women's World Cup players
1. FFC Turbine Potsdam players
FCR 2001 Duisburg players
FSV Frankfurt (women) players
Sportspeople from Bonn
Footballers at the 2004 Summer Olympics
Olympic bronze medalists for Germany
Olympic medalists in football
Medalists at the 2004 Summer Olympics
FIFA Women's World Cup-winning players
Hartford Hawks women's soccer players
Chicago Red Stars players
National Women's Soccer League players
German expatriate sportspeople in Switzerland
Expatriate women's footballers in Switzerland
Olympic footballers of Germany
UEFA Women's Championship-winning players
FC Zürich Frauen players
Swiss Women's Super League players
Women's association football defenders
Footballers from North Rhine-Westphalia
German expatriate sportspeople in the United States

Association football defenders
Expatriate footballers in Switzerland
Germany women's youth international footballers